Michael DiGiovancarlo is an American Democratic Party politician currently serving as a member of the Connecticut House of Representatives from the 74th district, which includes part of the city of Waterbury since 2021. Digiovancarlo was first elected to the seat in 2020, defeating incumbent Republican Stephanie Cummings by a 5.8% margin. DiGiovancarlo currently serves on the house's Public Safety and Security Committee, Veteran's Affairs Committee, and the Commerce Committee.

References

Living people
Democratic Party members of the Connecticut House of Representatives
People from Waterbury, Connecticut
Year of birth missing (living people)